Science Magazine, also known as Science, is an academic journal published by the American Association for the Advancement of Science.

Science Magazine may also refer to:

 Science Journal (1965–71 magazine)
 Science Magazine (TV series)
 The Sciences, a popular science magazine

See also
List of science magazines
Scientific journal